List of the Pittsburgh Pirates franchise home run leaders with 40 or more home runs.

(Correct as of March, 12 2023)

List

References

Home run